Vadim Gluzman (Вадим Михайлович Глузман, born 1973) is a Israeli classical violinist.

Born in Zhytomyr in Ukraine in the former Soviet Union, Vadim Gluzman spent most of his childhood in Riga, Latvia. His father is a conductor and clarinet player, and his mother a musicologist. Gluzman began violin studies at age 7. He studied with Roman Šnē in Latvia and Zakhar Bron in Russia. In 1990, his family moved to Israel, where he became a student of Yair Kless. He also met Isaac Stern who became an important mentor. In the United States, Gluzman's teachers were Arkady Fomin and, at the Juilliard School, Dorothy DeLay and Masao Kawasaki. Early in his career, Gluzman enjoyed the encouragement and support of Isaac Stern. In 1994, he received the Henryk Szeryng Foundation Career Award.

Gluzman plays a 1690 Stradivarius violin known as the "Ex-Leopold Auer" (after its previous owner, Hungarian violinist Leopold Auer). It is on extended loan from the Stradivari Society of Chicago.

Vadim Gluzman has performed with many of the world's leading orchestras including Chicago Symphony, London Philharmonic, Israel Philharmonic, London Symphony Orchestra, Leipzig Gewandhaus, Munich Philharmonic, San Francisco Symphony, Minnesota Orchestra and NHK Symphony. He has recorded or performed live the premieres of works by Giya Kancheli, Peteris Vasks, Lera Auerbach (24 Preludes, recorded on BIS), and Sofia Gubaidulina. Gluzman also serves as the Creative Partner and Principal Guest Artist for ProMusica Chamber Orchestra in Columbus, Ohio. He serves on the faculty of the Peabody Conservatory in Baltimore.

His recording of Bruch's Violin Concerto No. 1 (BIS) was awarded a Diapason d'Or in 2011.

References

External links 
 Official Vadim Gluzman site
 Jewish Chronicle On-Line
 Interview in german with Vadim Gluzman

Israeli classical violinists
Male classical violinists
1973 births
Living people
Ukrainian emigrants to Israel
Jewish classical musicians
21st-century classical violinists
21st-century male musicians